David Mark Ritchie (born 20 January 1971) is an English former professional footballer who played in the Football League for Stockport County.

Career
Ritchie was born in Stoke-on-Trent and played in the youth side at Stoke City. His father, John had previously spent 11 seasons at the Victoria Ground becoming the club's record goalscorer with 176. David was joined Stockport County in March 1990 having never made an appearance for Stoke. He only made one appearance for Stockport which came in a 2–1 win away at Hereford United on 17 March 1990. He later played for non-league sides Newcastle Town, Northwich Victoria and Kettering Town.

Career statistics
Source:

References

English footballers
English Football League players
Stoke City F.C. players
Stockport County F.C. players
1971 births
Living people
Association football forwards
Newcastle Town F.C. players
Northwich Victoria F.C. players
Kettering Town F.C. players